Major Hoople's Boarding House is a Canadian pop band from Galt, Ontario (now Cambridge, Ontario). They have released two albums and several singles, three of which appeared on national charts.

History
In 1967, Rocky Howell (vocals), Peter Padalino (guitar), Gail Selkirk (vocals, keyboards), David Lodge (bass, saxophone, vocals) and drummer Rick Riddell  formed a band in Galt called the Shan-De-Leers. They then moved to Kitchener, Ontario which, at the time, was a hub of new musical talent. There, they were taken up by what Padalino called "The Mike Bergauer Machine": Bergauer was a local musician, teacher and arranger who mentored numerous bands. The band was renamed Major Hoople's Boarding House;  the name referred to the long-running Gene Ahern comic strip, Our Boarding House (Ahern gave his permission for its use). They were then signed to the booking agency Grand Productions. They began playing university dates and festivals, and released eight singles, including two for Montreal's MUCH Records and six for Polydor Records. In 1972, Riddell and Selkirk left the band and were replaced by Ed Miller and Peter Beacock.

In 1975, the band was signed by Axe Records. Lodge left the band to concentrate on songwriting and management; he was replaced by Keith Stahlbaum and, on saxophone, Dave Gooding. Also in 1975, they had a Canadian radio hit with "I'm Running After You", which peaked at No. 16. Their 1976 singles "You Girl" and "Got You on my Mind" also did well on radio; singer James Leroy joined the band that year.

The band spent a number of years performing on the Ontario club circuit and at summer dance halls. In 1980, they released the single "Our House", which appeared on the RPM 100 chart in October and November. By now, they had added David Gregg on trombone; their 1980 single "Someone" performed well.

In 1981, they released The Hooples Album and went on a cross-Canada tour. In 1982, they performed the Electrohome 75th Anniversary Concert with the Kitchener-Waterloo Symphony at the University of Waterloo.

They continued performing in the 1980s with a varying lineup, and then went on hiatus as some of the members joined other bands; Padalino and Beacock joined the country band Desert Dolphins.

Lodge had been working as a songwriter for Peermusic (and was the writer of the international Peter Schilling hit "Major Tom"). He returned to the band in 1985 and they recorded a second album in 1985 "The New Adventures of Hooples", which yielded a top-10 single "Late Night Invitation", written by Lodge and drummer Grant Heywood, who had joined the band in 1981. This was also made into a music video. The lineup at that time included Heywood, Lodge, Howell and Jack Kalenderian. Lodge then passed away and the band toured with the new lineup of Grant Heywood (band leader/drums), Rocky Howell (guitar), Ralph Hetke (keyboards) and Gary Hintz (bass). They continued to tour into the early 1990's.

In 2008, Beacock and Stahlbaum formed a new band, The Fossilz, with guitarist Brian Tozer, drummer John Rankin, and drummer/vocalist Ron Duke. When Gooding and Miller returned in 2010, they reverted to their original name and were joined by 
Brad Stahlbaum (keyboards) and Rena Gaile; Peter Padalino returned. In 2012, the band released the single "Sunnyside"; they also released the James Leroy song "Sailor".

Discography

Albums
 The Hooples Album, 1981, Axe Records (re-issued 2013)
 The New Adventures of Hooples, 1985, Major Records

Singles
 "Beautiful Morning", (B: "Love Back"), 1970, Polydor
 "Lady", (B: "Your Kite, My Kite"), 1970, Much
 "Lady Song", (B: "She's Got All Of My Body"), 1971, Polydor
 "Everything's the Same", (B: "I Believe in You"), 1972, Polydor
 "Face on the Wind", 1973, Chelsea Records
 "I'm Running After You", (B: "Questions in Mind"), 1975, Axe Records
 "You Girl", (B: "Barnstormer"), 1976, Axe Records
 "I've Got You On My Mind", (B: "Magic Of A Feeling"), 1976, Axe Records
 "Someone", 1980, (B: "Loving You"), Axe Records
 "Our House", 1980, Axe Records
 "This Song Reminds Me of You", (B: "I'm Easy"), 1981, Axe Records
 "You're Hurtin' Everyone", (B: "Good Morning Sun"), 1983, Axe Records
 "Late-Night Invitation", (B: "Meet Me Later"), 1985, Major Records
 "You're Right", (B: "Love on the Run"), 1985, Major Records
 "Sailor", 2012
 "Sunnyside", 2012

References

Musical groups from the Regional Municipality of Waterloo
Canadian pop music groups
Musical groups with year of establishment missing